Big Green is a 501(c)(3) nonprofit organization started in 2011 by Kimbal Musk and his partner Hugo Matheson. They operated The Kitchen restaurant group with the belief that every child should have the opportunity to play, learn and grow in healthy communities. 

A combination of playground and outdoor classroom, the learning gardens are spaces where learners discover and get trained on the science of growing fruits and vegetables. It aims to enhance students' health and improve communities through the creation of practical, garden-based education opportunities.

History
Big Green was established in 2011 by Kimbal Musk and Hugo Matheson. Its core idea is that school gardens helping boost school children’s fondness for healthy foods. These gardens were conceptualized to assist children in building up better responses to pressures and anxieties and improve learners' academic performance. Its founders intend Big Green to be replicated in other schools and generate a range of school-related solutions. The first learning garden was constructed in Denver, Colorado at Schmitt Elementary.

Learning gardens 
A “learning garden” is an out-of-doors classroom that also serves as a productive garden of food plants. It is composed of modular, raised beds with seating and shade, providing space for teaching and learning.  The gardens are designed to become vehicles for comprehensive mindset change regarding child nourishment, socialization and student achievement. They are also designed to go well with any type of school structure, whether urban or rural.

The food harvested from the learning gardens are sold to restaurants. The activity aims to teach students to become young entrepreneurs and acquire business abilities.

Controversy 
Big Green has been accused of illegally discriminating against and firing employees who were attempting to organize the workers.

References

External links 
Kimbal Musk — Elon’s brother — is leading a $25 million mission to fix food in schools across the US
Big Green Plan to Build Learning Gardens and Food Literacy Programs in 100 Schools
National nonprofit aims to put gardens in 100 Detroit schools
Kimbal Musk has a Silicon Valley-Style Plan to Feed America
Entrepreneur Kimbal Musk on his passion for food
Large organic learning gardens being built at Oak Park schools
Kimbal Musk is Changing the Food System One School Garden at a Time
Davidson: Learning Gardens rooted in kids’ education
Learning Landscapes

Non-profit organizations based in the United States
Organizations established in 2011
2011 establishments in the United States